Peter Ruch (born 8 April 1941) is a Swiss former sports shooter. He competed in the 50 metre rifle three positions event at the 1968 Summer Olympics.

References

1941 births
Living people
Swiss male sport shooters
Olympic shooters of Switzerland
Shooters at the 1968 Summer Olympics
Sportspeople from Bern